Scott Mayle (born October 14, 1983 in Philippi, West Virginia) is a former American football wide receiver. He was signed by the Buffalo Bills as an undrafted free agent in 2007. He played college football at Ohio.

Mayle has also been a member of the Kansas City Chiefs.

Early years
A four-sport athlete at Philip Barbour High School, Mayle earned three letters in football and track, two in basketball and one in baseball. He was the Big Ten Conference Co-Player of the Year in 2000 and 2001 and earned all-state and all-state honorable mention during his career. During his senior year, he helped the Colts to a third-place finish in the conference and a No. 13 ranking in the state.

College career
As a player for the Ohio Bobcats of Ohio University, Mayle ranked fourth in school history for most receptions in a career with 107, second in most receiving yards in a career with 1,847, and third in touchdown receptions for a career with 11. As a senior, he caught 28 passes for a team-high 411 yards, and his 14.7 yards per catch was the highest on the team. He had four rushes for 57 yards and a touchdown, and led the Bobcats with 14 kickoff returns for 287 5 yards. In his senior season, he helped lead the Bobcats to a MAC East Division title, a MAC Championship Game appearance, and a 2007 GMAC Bowl appearance.

Mayle also earned acclaim at Ohio as a world-class track and field athlete in the long jump.  In both the 2006 and 2007 indoor and outdoor seasons, he earned a spot at the NCAA championships. During his senior year, he was ranked fourth in the world during the indoor season.

Professional career

Buffalo Bills
Scott Mayle was originally signed by the Buffalo Bills as an undrafted free agent in 2007.
Mayle was cut by the Buffalo Bills on August 31, 2008.

Kansas City Chiefs
Mayle was signed to the practice squad of the Kansas City Chiefs on September 3, 2008. He was released a few weeks later.

See also
Chestnut Ridge people

References

External links
Ohio Bobcats bio

1983 births
American football wide receivers
Buffalo Bills players
Kansas City Chiefs players
Living people
Ohio Bobcats football players
People from Philippi, West Virginia
Players of American football from West Virginia
Track and field athletes from West Virginia